Lopidea major, the Red Mountain laurel mirid, is a species of plant bug in the family Miridae. It is found in Central America and North America.  It is a frequently-encountered pest of the Texas Mountain Laurel, though they apparently do little real damage.

References

Further reading

 
 

Articles created by Qbugbot
Insects described in 1918
Orthotylini